Mohammad-Taqi Shoushtari, known as "Sheikh-e-Shoushtari" was an Iranian Twelver Shia scholar, who was born in 1903 in the city of Najaf, Iraq. Shoushtari's father (Mohammad Kazem Shushtari) is originally from Shoushtar and his mother was from Kerman. He was living in Najaf until the age of 7; afterwards came back to Shushtar.

Sheikh-Shoushtari has written diverse books, amongst of them is "Behja-al-Sabaqah Fi Sharh Nahj-al-Balaqah" in 14 volumes. He also has written the book of "Qamus-al-Rejal" which has been chosen as Iran's Book of the Year Awards in 1992. Mohammad-Taqi eventually died on 19 May 1995 at the age of 95 in the city of Shoushtar.

Teachers 

Mohammad Taqi Shoushtari had several teachers, among of them are as follows:
 Seyyed Hossein Nouri
 Seyyed Ali-Asqar Hakim (1930)
 Seyyed Mohammad-Ali Emam Known As Emam Shoushtari (1891-1974)
 Mohammad-Kazem Shoushtari (His Father)
 Seyyed Mahdi Ale-Tayeb Jazayeri (1943)
 Seyyed Mohammad-Taqi Sheikhol-Eslam (1924)

Works 
Amongst the works/books of Sheikh-Shoushtari are:

 Al-Najmah Fi Sharh Al-Ameh
 Bahj Al-Sabbaqeh Fi Sharh Nahj Al-Balaqeh
 Ayat Al-Bayyenat Fi Haqiyeh Ba'z Al-Manamat
 Al-Arbaoun Haditha
 Resaleh Dar Mohakemeye Beine Sadouq Va Sheikh Mofid Dar Yek Masa'leh Kalami
 Al-Resaleh Al-Mobsareh Fi Ahval Abi-Basir
 Qaza Amir Al-Momenin Ali Ibn Abi Taleb
 Al-Avael
 Al-Badaya'
 Resaleh Fi Tavarikh Al-Nabi Va Alal
 Akhbar Al-Dakhileh
 Moqaddameh Tohid Mofazzal

References 

People from Shushtar
1903 births
1995 deaths
People from Najaf
Shia clerics
20th-century Muslim scholars of Islam
Iranian Shia scholars of Islam